Veselin Penev (born 11 August 1982) is a Bulgarian footballer who plays as a left-sided defender for Minyor Radnevo.

Career
Penev started his career in Stara Zagora with the local team Beroe. He was raised in Beroe Stara Zagora's youth teams. Between 2003 and 2006, he played for Naftex Burgas. He signed with Chernomorets in June 2006 on a free transfer from Naftex Burgas.

Honours

Club
Beroe
Bulgarian Cup (1): 2013
Bulgarian Supercup (1): 2013

References

1982 births
Living people
Bulgarian footballers
First Professional Football League (Bulgaria) players
PFC Beroe Stara Zagora players
Neftochimic Burgas players
PFC Chernomorets Burgas players
PFC Spartak Varna players
PFC Nesebar players
FC Minyor Radnevo players
Association football defenders